Curculigo is a flowering plant genus in the family Hypoxidaceae, first described in 1788. It is widespread across tropical regions of Asia, Africa, Australia, and the Americas.

Curculin is a sweet protein that was discovered and isolated in 1990 from the fruit of Curculigo latifolia, a plant from Malaysia. Like miraculin, curculin exhibits taste-modifying activity; however, unlike miraculin, it also exhibits a  sweet taste by itself. After consumption of curculin, water and sour solutions taste sweet.  The plant is referred to locally as 'lembah' or 'lumbah'; English: 'weevil-wort'.

Species
 Curculigo annamitica Gagnep.  – Vietnam
 Curculigo breviscapa S.C.Chen – China (Guangxi, Guangdong)
 Curculigo conoc Gagnep. – Vietnam
 Curculigo disticha Gagnep. – Vietnam
 Curculigo ensifolia R.Br. – Australia
 Curculigo erecta Lauterb. – Philippines, Sumatra, New Guinea, Solomon Island
 Curculigo maharashtrensis M.R.Almeida & S.Yadav – Maharashtra
 Curculigo orchioides Gaertn. – China, Japan, Indian Subcontinent, Papuasia, Micronesia
 Curculigo janarthanamii R.D. Gore & S.P. Gaikwad  – India
 Curculigo sabui S.P. Gaikwad & Gore  – India
 Curculigo pilosa (Schumach. & Thonn.) Engl. – tropical Africa, Madagascar
 Curculigo racemosa Ridl. – Borneo
 Curculigo savantwadiensis M.R.Almeida & S.Yadav – Maharashtra
 Curculigo scorzonerifolia (Lam.) Baker – southern Mexico, Central America, West Indies, northern South America
 Curculigo seychellensis Bojer ex Baker – Seychelles
 Curculigo sinensis S.C.Chen – China (Yunnan)
 Curculigo tonkinensis Gagnep.  – Vietnam

References 

Curculigo janarthanamii Gore & S.P.Gaikwad, Phytotaxa 357(1): 72 (2018).
Curculigo sabui S.P.Gaikwad & Gore, Nordic J. Bot. 37(7)-e02340: 2 (2019)

External links 

 
Asparagales genera